Vaterite is a mineral, a polymorph of calcium carbonate (CaCO3). It was named after the German mineralogist Heinrich Vater. It is also known as mu-calcium carbonate (μ-CaCO3). Vaterite belongs to the hexagonal crystal system, whereas calcite is trigonal and aragonite is orthorhombic.

Vaterite, like aragonite, is a metastable phase of calcium carbonate at ambient conditions at the surface of the earth. As it is less stable than either calcite or aragonite, vaterite has a higher solubility than either of these phases. Therefore, once vaterite is exposed to water, it converts to calcite (at low temperature) or aragonite (at high temperature: ~60 °C). At 37 °C for example a solution-mediated transition from vaterite to calcite occurs, where the vaterite dissolves and subsequently precipitates as calcite assisted by an Ostwald ripening process.

However, vaterite does occur naturally in mineral springs, organic tissue, gallstones, urinary calculi and plants. In those circumstances, some impurities (metal ions or organic matter) may stabilize the vaterite and prevent its transformation into calcite or aragonite. Vaterite is usually colorless.

Vaterite can be produced as the first mineral deposits repairing natural or experimentally-induced shell damage in some aragonite-shelled mollusks (e.g. gastropods). Subsequent shell deposition occurs as aragonite. In 2018, vaterite was identified as a constituent of a deposit formed on the leaves of Saxifraga at Cambridge University Botanic Garden.

See also
Monohydrocalcite, CaCO3·H2O
Ikaite, CaCO3·6H2O
List of minerals
List of minerals named after people

References

Calcium minerals
Carbonate minerals
Hexagonal minerals
Minerals in space group 194
Polymorphism (materials science)